Couleuvre is a commune in the department of Allier in Auvergne in central France.

Population

See also
Communes of the Allier department

References

External links

 Official site

Communes of Allier
Allier communes articles needing translation from French Wikipedia